Return of Mr. Superman is a 1960 Indian film directed by Manmohan Sabir.  It is an unauthorized retelling of the origins of Superman.

Plot
Finding a young child in the wreckage of a strange aircraft, a farmer and his wife raise the boy as their own.  Growing up to become a newspaper reporter, he takes on a double life of a super hero when smugglers threaten the peace.

Cast
Paidi JairajSheila RamaniNaaziShammiMajnuHelenDavid

Soundtrack
"Dekh O Baabu Dekh Dil Ki Dukaan" - Meena Kapoor
"Dil Hamko Dhoondhata Hai" - Meena Kapoor, Suman Kalyanpur
"Dil Milaate Jaaiye Nazaren Milaate Jaaiye" - Meena Kapoor
"Ek To Hoon Main Haseen Baabu" - Meena Kapoor
"Kisiko Yoon Tumnnaon Mein" - Meena Kapoor
"Muhabbat Kisko Kehte Hain" - Mubarak Begum
"Stella O Stella Tera Jaani Tha Ab Tak Akela" - Meena Kapoor, Mahendra Kapoor
"Tu Haseen Hai Tu Jawaan Hai" - N/A

References

External links

Films scored by Anil Biswas
1960 films
Fan films based on Superman
Indian superhero films
Unofficial Superman films
1960s Hindi-language films
1960s American films